Itte Junior Ronson Detenamo (born 22 September 1986 in Buada) is a Nauruan weightlifter competing in the +105 kg category.

Detenamo represented Nauru at the 2004 Summer Olympics in Athens, finishing 14th in the men's 105+kg category. He won a bronze medal at the 2006 Commonwealth Games, and three gold medals at the 2007 South Pacific Games.

He was Nauru's sole representative at the 2008 Summer Olympics in Beijing. He achieved a personal best by lifting 386 kg in the super-heavyweight category.

He took part in the 2010 Commonwealth Games, and after being described as Nauru's best hope for a gold medal there, he won silver.

He was also a participant at the 2012 Summer Olympics, finishing 14th.

At the 2014 Commonwealth Games, he was Nauru's flagbearer.

Detenamo's father and older sister are also weightlifters, as are other members of his family.  His father introduced him to the sport, which Detenamo took up at the age of 10.

Major results

Medalbox notes

References 
 "Nauru Weightlifter Hoists Island's Hopes of First Olympic Medal", Bloomberg, 8 August 2008

External links
 
 Biography on the website of the Beijing Olympics

Living people
1986 births
Nauruan male weightlifters
Olympic weightlifters of Nauru
Weightlifters at the 2004 Summer Olympics
Weightlifters at the 2008 Summer Olympics
Weightlifters at the 2012 Summer Olympics
Commonwealth Games bronze medallists for Nauru
Commonwealth Games medallists in weightlifting
Weightlifters at the 2006 Commonwealth Games
Weightlifters at the 2010 Commonwealth Games
Weightlifters at the 2014 Commonwealth Games
Commonwealth Games silver medallists for Nauru
Medallists at the 2006 Commonwealth Games
Medallists at the 2010 Commonwealth Games
Medallists at the 2014 Commonwealth Games